Malcolm Sawyer, erroneously reported as Tom Sawyer (born circa 23 June 1959) is a Zimbabwe former rugby union player. He played as lock. He played three matches at the 1987 Rugby World Cup.

References

External links

1960 births

Year of birth uncertain
Living people
Zimbabwean rugby union players
Zimbabwe international rugby union players
Place of birth unknown